The 2015 BYU Cougars women's volleyball team represented Brigham Young University in the 2015 NCAA Division I women's volleyball season. The Cougars were led by first year head coach Heather Olmstead and played their home games at the Smith Fieldhouse. The Cougars were members of the WCC.

BYU came off a season where they won the WCC regular season championship, participated in the NCAA tournament, and became the first unseeded team to make it to the National Championship match.

Season highlights
BYU won the 2015 Marcia E. Hamilton Classic title.
Alexa Gray won WCC Player of the Week honors for games 8/30-9/6, 11/2-11/8, 11/9-11/15, and 11/16–11/22.
Amy Boswell won WCC Player of the Week honors for games 9/14-9/20.
On November 17 Alexa Gray was named the National Player of the Week for games 11/9-11/15.
On November 19 Alexa Gray set the single season rally era kill record for BYU in the victory over Santa Clara. The record moved her into fifth all-time at BYU.
On November 21 BYU clinched an NCAA Tournament berth with a sweep of San Francisco. The win clinched a share of the conference title with San Diego, but with BYU having won both head-to-head matches, they were given the conferences auto tourney bid.

Roster

Schedule
All conference home games on BYUtv will be simulcast on BYU Radio with the exception of the Santa Clara game.

 *-Indicates Conference Opponent
 y-Indicates NCAA Playoffs
 Times listed are Mountain Time Zone.

Announcers for televised games
vs. Chicago State: Paul Duchesne, Chelsea Reber, & Dustin Avol
vs. North Carolina: Paul Duchesne, Chelsea Reber, & Dustin Avol
@ USC: Kevin Barnett & Tammy Blackburn
@ Saint Louis: No commentary (video only)
vs. Purdue: Kim Cook & Wendy Mayer (Internet radio, no video stream)
Idaho State: Spencer Linton & Kristen Kozlowski
Oregon State: Jarom Jordan & Kristen Kozlowski
@ Utah: Thad Anderson & Amy Gant
@ Utah Valley: Matthew Baiamonte & Steve Vail
@ San Francisco: Pat Olson
@ Santa Clara: No commentary (video only)
Loyola Marymount: Melissa Lee & Holly McPeak
@ San Diego: No commentary (video only)
@ Pacific: Paul Sunderland & Kevin Barnett
@ Saint Mary's: Alex Jensen & Scott Chisholm
Gonzaga: Spencer Linton, Amy Gant, & Jason Shepherd
Portland: Robbie Bullough & Tambre Haddock Nobles
@ Pepperdine: Al Epstein
@ Loyola Marymount: Peter Monoceros & Hunter Patterson
San Diego: Spencer Linton, Kristen Kozlowski, & Jason Shepherd
Saint Mary's: Jarom Jordan, Amy Gant, & Jason Shepherd
Pacific: Jarom Jordan, Amy Gant, & Jason Shepherd
@ Portland: Jason Brough
@ Gonzaga: No commentary (video only)
Santa Clara: Spencer Linton, Kristen Kozlowski, & Jason Shepherd
Pepperdine: Spencer Linton, Kristen Kozlowski, & Jason Shepherd
Ohio: Spencer Linton, Kristen Kozlowski, & Jason Shepherd
Western Kentucky: Spencer Linton, Kristen Kozlowski, & Jason Shepherd
vs. Nebraska: Tiffany Greene & Missy Whittemore

See also
For information on BYU's other fall and winter sports please check out the following:

References

BYU
BYU Cougars women's volleyball seasons
BYU Cougars women's volleyball